is a former Japanese football player.

Playing career
Tsuruta was born in Aichi Prefecture on January 4, 1968. After graduating from Osaka University of Health and Sport Sciences, he joined his local club Toyota Motors (later Nagoya Grampus Eight) in 1990. He played many matches as midfielder from first season. However he could hardly play in the match in 1994 and he moved to Japan Football League club Vissel Kobe in 1995. However his opportunity to play decreased in 1996 and he retired end of 1996 season. In July 2000, he returned as a player at Ventforet Kofu and played for the club until end of season.

Coaching career
After retirement, Tsuruta started coaching career at Nagoya Grampus Eight in 1997. He mainly coached for youth team until 1999. In 2000, he moved to Ventforet Kofu and became a physical coach. He resigned end of 2000 season.

Club statistics

References

External links

1968 births
Living people
Osaka University of Health and Sport Sciences alumni
Association football people from Aichi Prefecture
Japanese footballers
Japan Soccer League players
J1 League players
J2 League players
Japan Football League (1992–1998) players
Nagoya Grampus players
Vissel Kobe players
Ventforet Kofu players
Association football midfielders